Heyersdorf is a municipality in the Thuringian district of Altenburger Land.

Geography
Heyersdorf is located near the municipalities of Ponitz, the city of Schmölln, and Thonhausen in the district of Altenburger Land; as well as near the city of Crimmitschau in the Saxon district of Zwickauer Land.

History
Until 1920, Heyersdorf was part of the Kingdom of Saxony.

Politics
Together with Ponitz, Heyersdorf is the assigning municipality for Gößnitz.

Business and infrastructure
Heyersdorf is located on Bundesautobahn 4.

Twin towns
Heyersdorf is twinned with:

  Kieselbronn, Germany, since 1993
  Bernin, France, since 1995

References

Altenburger Land